is a Japanese former professional boxer who competed from 2005 to 2019. He was a three-weight world champion, having held the WBA mini-flyweight title from 2011 to 2012, the WBC and The Ring flyweight titles from 2013 to 2014, and the IBF light-flyweight title from 2015 to 2016. He is an alumnus of the Takushoku University.

Professional career
Yaegashi finished his amateur career with a record of 56–14 after winning the Inter-High School Championship and the National Sports Festival of Japan. His professional debut was at the Yokohama Cultural Gymnasium in March 2005. He won the vacant OPBF mini-flyweight title there via a fifth-round technical knockout in April 2006 and defended the title once before vacating it.

In his first world title shot against the WBC mini-flyweight champion Eagle Kyowa at the Pacifico Yokohama in June 2007, Yaegashi lost for the first time by a wide points margin after suffering a broken TMJ in two places due to an accidental headbutt in the second round.

After a nearly eleven-month absence from the ring, Yaegashi restarted his career, but lost in the semi-final match of the annual Japanese title elimination tournament nicknamed "The Strongest in Korakuen" at the Korakuen Hall in Tokyo in July 2008. It was in June 2009 that Yaegashi won the vacant Japanese mini-flyweight title at the IMP Hall in Osaka. He defended the title three times before returning it.

Yaegashi won the WBA mini-flyweight title in his second world title shot against Thai's Pornsawan Porpramook via a tenth-round technical knockout at the Korakuen Hall on October 24, 2011. It was a very tough fight. Before the final round began, Yaegashi's manager Ohashi said to him "Come back for your son". The fight earned accolades from international media, winning Fight of the Year honors from ESPN.com and BoxingScene.com, as well as the WBA's award for Most Dramatic Fight of 2011.

On June 20, 2012, in a match that marked the first time two Japanese fighters had met to unify world titles, he lost to the WBC champion Kazuto Ioka via a unanimous decision at the Bodymaker Colosseum. When asked whether the result would have been different unless he got swollen eyes, Yaegashi said "We should not think about it. There is no if's in boxing". The day after the fight, Ioka decided to move up a weight division. So, Yaegashi's team hope the rematch with Ioka in a higher division as their second unification bout. First, Yaegashi aims to win a world championship again.

Yaegashi returned to the ring in a light-flyweight bout at the Korakuen Hall on January 5, 2013, to knock out Saenmuangloei Kokietgym in the ninth round.

Yaegashi became a two-weight class champion when he defeated defending WBC and The Ring flyweight champion, Toshiyuki Igarashi in a unanimous decision on April 8, 2013, in Tokyo, Japan. On 12 August 2013, Yaegashi successfully defended his title by defeating Mexican fighter Oscar Blanquet. Yaegashi floored Blanquet in the 8th round on his way to a points victory.

Yaegashi became a three-weight world champion after defeating IBF light-flyweight champion Javier Mendoza via unanimous decision.

Professional boxing record

Exhibition boxing record

Recognitions
2011 ESPN.com Fight of the Year
2011 BoxingScene.com Fight of the Year
2011 WBA Most Dramatic Fight

See also
List of Mini-flyweight boxing champions
List of light-flyweight boxing champions
List of flyweight boxing champions
List of boxing triple champions
List of Japanese boxing world champions
Boxing in Japan

References

External links
 
  
 Akira Yaegashi - CBZ Profile

|-

|-

|-

1983 births
Living people
Mini-flyweight boxers
Light-flyweight boxers
Flyweight boxers
World mini-flyweight boxing champions
World light-flyweight boxing champions
World flyweight boxing champions
World Boxing Association champions
World Boxing Council champions
International Boxing Federation champions
The Ring (magazine) champions
People from Iwate Prefecture
Boxing commentators
Japanese male boxers